Santo Stefano in Aspromonte is a comune (municipality) in the Province of Reggio Calabria in the Italian region Calabria, located about  southwest of Catanzaro and about  northeast of Reggio Calabria.

 

The municipality of Santo Stefano in Aspromonte contains the frazioni (subdivisions, mainly villages and hamlets) Gambarie and Mannoli. 
Gambarie's ski resort is one of the closest to the sea in the world, as it is situated just over the Strait of Messina. Gambarie is one of the southernmost ski resorts in Europe, being situated on the 38th parallel, while Sierra Nevada in Spain is on the 37th. 

Santo Stefano in Aspromonte borders the following municipalities: Gambarie, Mannoli, Laganadi, Calanna, Sambatello, Reggio Calabria, Roccaforte del Greco, Sant'Eufemia d'Aspromonte, San Roberto, Sant'Alessio in Aspromonte, Scilla, Podargoni, Cerasi and Schindilifà.

Demographics

See also 
Giuseppe Musolino

Notes and references 

Cities and towns in Calabria